Fenton Lake State Park is a state park of New Mexico, USA, located  north of San Ysidro, in the Jemez Mountains. The  lake is a popular fishing destination.

It was featured as a filming location (showing the splash-landing of an alien spacecraft) in the 1976 movie The Man Who Fell to Earth.

References

External links
 Fenton Lake State Park

Jemez Mountains
State parks of New Mexico
Parks in Sandoval County, New Mexico
Protected areas established in 1984